Ellibou-Badasso is a village in southern Ivory Coast. It is in the sub-prefecture of Sikensi, Sikensi Department, Agnéby-Tiassa Region, Lagunes District.

Ellibou-Badasso was a commune until March 2012, when it became one of 1126 communes nationwide that were abolished. The village is now sometimes described as two separate but adjacent villages, Ellibou and Badasso.

Notes

Former communes of Ivory Coast
Populated places in Lagunes District
Populated places in Agnéby-Tiassa